Ladislav "Laco" Takács (born 15 July 1996) is a Czech professional footballer who plays as a defensive midfielder for Czech First League club FC Baník Ostrava.

Career
He made his league debut on 10 March 2014 in Teplice's 1–0 Czech First League home win against Slavia Prague. He moved to Mladá Boleslav in 2016.

Career statistics

References

External links

Ladislav Takács official international statistics

Ladislav Takács profile on the FK Mladá Boleslav official website

1996 births
Living people
People from Františkovy Lázně
Czech people of Hungarian descent
Czech footballers
Czech Republic youth international footballers
Czech Republic under-21 international footballers
Czech First League players
Association football defenders
FK Teplice players
FK Mladá Boleslav players
SK Slavia Prague players
FK Baník Sokolov players
FC Baník Ostrava players
Sportspeople from the Karlovy Vary Region
Czech National Football League players